Diadegma albicalcar is a wasp first described by Morley in 1913. No subspecies are listed.

References

albicalcar
Insects described in 1913